Mohamed Sherif Pasha GCSI (1826–1887) was an Egyptian statesman. He served as Prime Minister of Egypt three times during his career. His first term was between April 7, 1879 and August 18, 1879. His second term was served from September 14, 1881 to February 4, 1882. His final term was served between August 21, 1882 and January 7, 1884.

Biography 
Sherif, who was from Kavala in the Ottoman Empire (now in northern Greece), filled numerous administrative posts under Sa'id Pasha and Isma'il Pasha. He was better educated than most of his contemporaries, and had married a daughter of Colonel Sèves, the French non-commissioned officer who became Suleiman Pasha under Mehmet Ali. They were the maternal grandparents of Queen consort Nazli of Egypt and Regent Sherif Sabri Pasha

As minister of foreign affairs he was useful to Ismail, who used Sherif's bluff bonhomie to veil many of his most insidious proposals. Of singularly lazy disposition, he yet possessed considerable tact; he was in fact an Egyptian Lord Melbourne, whose policy was to leave everything alone.

Sherif's favorite argument against any reform was to appeal to the Pyramids as an immutable proof of the solidity of Egypt financially and politically. His fatal optimism rendered him largely responsible for the collapse of Egyptian credit which brought about the fall of Ismail.

Upon the military insurrection of September 1881 under Urabi Pasha, Sherif was summoned by the khedive Tawfiq to form a new ministry. The impossibility of reconciling the financial requirements of the national party with the demands of the British and French controllers of the public debt, compelled him to resign in the following February.

After the suppression of the Urabi Revolt he was again installed in office (August 1882) by Tawfiq, but in January 1884 he resigned rather than sanction the evacuation of the Sudanese regions of the Khedivate of Egypt. As to the strength of the Mahdist movement he had then no conception. When urged by Sir Evelyn Baring (Lord Cromer) early in 1883 to abandon some of the more distant parts of the Sudan, he replied with characteristic light-heartedness: "Nous en causerons plus tard ; d'abord nous allons donner une bonne raclée à ce monsieur" (We'll talk about that later, first we're going to give this gentleman (i.e. the self declared Mahdi, Muhammad Ahmad) a good thrashing). Hicks Pasha's expedition was at the time preparing to march on El Obeid.

Sherif died in Graz, Austria-Hungary, on April 20, 1887.

References 

1826 births
1887 deaths
19th-century prime ministers of Egypt
Egyptian Muslims
Egyptian pashas
Egyptian people of Greek descent
People of the 'Urabi revolt
Prime Ministers of Egypt
Foreign ministers of Egypt
Knights Grand Commander of the Order of the Star of India
Grand Viziers of Egypt
Irrigation Ministers of Egypt